Pustosh is a rural locality (a village) in Pyatovskoye Rural Settlement, Totemsky District, Vologda Oblast, Russia. The population was 13 as of 2002.

Geography 
Pustosh is located 18 km north of Totma (the district's administrative centre) by road. Matveyevo is the nearest rural locality.

References 

Rural localities in Totemsky District